The Tower of Cirith Ungol and Shelob's Lair is a 1984 fantasy role-playing game adventure published by Iron Crown Enterprises for Middle-earth Role Playing.

Contents
The Tower of Cirith Ungol and Shelob's Lair features plans of the fortress Cirith Ungol and its surrounding catacombs and includes game statistics for Shelob.

Reception
Andy Blakeman reviewed Shelob's Lair and the Tower of Cirith Ungol for Imagine magazine, and stated that "As usual, there is all the detail one could wish for on land, climate, politics and power, and of course, Cirith Ungol."

William A. Barton reviewed The Tower of Cirith Ungol and Shelob's Lair in The Space Gamer No. 73. Barton commented that "Several suggested adventures provide plenty of play ideas. This is the best of the adventure modules published so far."

References

Fantasy role-playing game adventures
Middle-earth Role Playing
Role-playing game supplements introduced in 1984